Gazidari-ye Sofla (also Romanized as Gazīdarī-ye Soflá; also known as Gazīdarī-ye Pā’īn) is a village in Arabkhaneh Rural District, Shusef District, Nehbandan County, South Khorasan Province, Iran. At the 2006 census, its population was 32, in 7 families.

References 

Populated places in Nehbandan County